The 1989 USA Outdoor Track and Field Championships took place between June 16–19 on the campus of University of Houston in Houston, Texas. The meet was organized by The Athletics Congress.

Results

Men's track events

Men's field events

Women's track events

Women's field events

See also
United States Olympic Trials (track and field)

References

 Results from T&FN
 results

USA Outdoor Track and Field Championships
Usa Outdoor Track And Field Championships, 1989
Track and field
Track and field in Texas
Outdoor Track and Field Championships
Outdoor Track and Field Championships